Margaret III (13 April 1350 – 16/21 March 1405) was a ruling Countess of Flanders, Countess of Artois, and Countess of Auvergne and Boulogne between 1384 and 1405. She was the last Countess of Flanders of the House of Dampierre. 

She was also Duchess of Burgundy by marriage to Philip I, Duke of Burgundy and Philip II, Duke of Burgundy.

Biography

Margaret was the only surviving child and heir of Count Louis II of Flanders (1346–1384) and Margaret of Brabant.

First marriage
In 1355, Margaret of Flanders married Philip of Rouvres, grandson and heir of Odo IV, Duke of Burgundy. Philip was Count of Burgundy and Artois (1347–1361), Duke of Burgundy (1350–1361), and became Count of Auvergne and Boulogne (1360–1361).

Second marriage
Following Philip's death from a riding accident in 1361, Margaret was widowed and had no issue by him. King John II of France then claimed the Duchy of Burgundy for the kingdom of France, by escheat. In 1364, Philip the Bold, King John's youngest son, was granted the duchy, and subsequently married Margaret. Margaret's second marriage to Philip the Bold took place in 1369.

Ruling Countess
When Margaret's father, the Count of Flanders, died in 1384, she and Philip inherited the counties of Artois, Burgundy, Flanders, Nevers, and Rethel. Philip died in 1404, and Margaret died the following year. 

With her death, the House of Dampierre came to an end, and the County of Flanders lost its (relative) independence to Burgundy. It came under the rule of her son, John the Fearless, and later to the House of Habsburg.

Issue

Margaret and Philip had the following children:
 John I of Burgundy, Duke of Burgundy (1371–1419, murdered at Montereau), her eldest son and successor in Flanders, Artois, and Burgundy.
 Charles of Burgundy (1372–1373)
 Margaret of Burgundy (October 1374 – March 8, 1441, Le Quesnoy), married William II, Duke of Bavaria.
 Louis of Burgundy (1377–1378)
 Catherine of Burgundy (April 1378, Montbard – January 24, 1425, Gray, Haute-Saône), married Leopold IV, Duke of Austria.
 Bonne of Burgundy (1379–1399, Arras)
 Mary of Burgundy (September 1380, Dijon – October 2, 1422, Thonon-les-Bains), married Amadeus VIII, Duke of Savoy.
 Antoine of Burgundy, Duke of Brabant (August, 1384 – October 25, 1415, at the Battle of Agincourt.)
 Philip II, Count of Nevers and Rethel (1389–1415, at the Battle of Agincourt.), as "Philip II".

Legacy

The main line of the House of Dampierre ended with Margaret III. The Dampierres, originally only counts of Flanders, had through a clever marriage policy managed to inherit the counties of Nevers (1280) and Rethel (1328). Through her grandmother, a daughter of King Philip V of France, the counties of Artois and Burgundy (the "Franche Comté") were added to this (1382). These lands were to provide the core of the dominions of the House of Valois-Burgundy, which were, together with the Duchy of Burgundy, to provide them with a power base to challenge the rule of their cousins, the Valois kings of France in the 15th century.

Her eldest son, John the Fearless, succeeded her father Louis as Count of Nevers in 1384, her husband in 1404 as Duke of Burgundy and her as Count of Burgundy, Count of Artois, and Count of Flanders. In 1406 her younger son Anthony inherited Brabant and Limburg. Nevers and Rethel were at first, in her lifetime, given to her eldest sons John (Nevers) and Anthony (Rethel), but after John's accession to the duchy, Nevers went to her youngest son Philip. Rethel was given to Philip in 1402 when it became clear that Anthony would inherit Brabant.

Residences

In Burgundy, the Château de Germolles, offered to Margaret of Flanders by Philip the Bold in 1381, was transformed by the Duchess of Burgundy into a sumptuous country estate. It was a large rectangular building, surrounded by a moat, that enclosed a courtyard. The south and east wings contained the living apartments, while the west wing held the reception rooms. Margaret, being energetic and a country lover, decided to develop at the estate some rustic activities that would create a pleasant environment around this favourite residence of hers, as well as developing local agriculture and providing some income for the maintenance of the domain. Thus, she planted a large rose garden, and the petals were sent to Flanders to be used to make rose water. Largely preserved, the Château is today one of the best examples of the princely residences in France at the end of the Middle Ages.

Ancestry

References

Sources

|-

Countesses of Flanders
Countesses of Artois
Countesses of Nevers
Counts of Rethel
Countesses of Burgundy
House of Dampierre
1350 births
1405 deaths
Duchesses of Burgundy
Flanders, Countess of, Margaret III
14th-century women rulers
15th-century women rulers
14th-century women from the county of Flanders
14th-century French people
14th-century French women
15th-century French people 
15th-century French women
Remarried royal consorts